Justin Coloma (born October 31, 1975) is a Peruvian American film director and editor.

Biography
Justin Coloma was raised in Lima, Peru, and moved to California in 1992. He received a Bachelor of Arts in Film Studies from The University of California, Berkeley, in 1998. He is best known for his music video work with Smashing Pumpkins, including "Superchrist" and "G.L.O.W.".

He was the principal editor of  If All Goes Wrong, produced by Coming Home Studios, which chronicles the Smashing Pumpkins' 12 show residency at the Fillmore in San Francisco in July and August 2007.

Justin Coloma married Linda Strawberry on July 18, 2009.

Videography

2003

Eagles of Death Metal – "Midnight Creeper"

2007

Linda Strawberry – "Dig"

2008

Smashing Pumpkins – "G.L.O.W."
Smashing Pumpkins – "Superchrist"

2009

The Higher – "It's Only Natural"
Boomkat – "Lonely Child"
Miss Derringer – "Click Click Bang Bang"

2010
Morgan Page – "Fight For You"

2011
Morgan Page – "I've Had Friends"
Peter Murphy – "I Spit Roses"
Peter Murphy – "Seesaw Sway"
Peter Murphy – "The Prince and Old Lady Shade"
Uh Huh Her – "Black and Blue"
Uh Huh Her – "Another Case"
Uh Huh Her – "Wake to Sleep"
Morgan Page – "In the Air"

2012
Ashlee Simpson – "Bat For a Heart"

2013
Delta Rae – "If I Loved You"
Echosmith – "Come Together"

2021
Jessica Simpson - "Particles"

References

External links
 

Reel of Justin Coloma on Youtube
Video for "Dig" by Linda Strawberry
"Superchrist" on Smashing Pumpkins Myspace

1975 births
Living people
American music video directors
Peruvian film directors
Peruvian emigrants to the United States
UC Berkeley College of Letters and Science alumni